Simone Fischer-Hübner (born Lübeck, 1963) is an expert on IT security and personal integrity and a professor at the Department of Computer Science at Karlstad University. 

Fischer-Hübner has been a member of the Cyber Security Council at the Swedish Civil Contingencies Agency (MSB) since 2011. Moreover, she is the Swedish representative and vice chair of IFIP Technical Committee 11 on Information Security and Privacy, board member of the Swedish Forum för Dataskydd, advisory board member of PETS (Privacy Enhancing Technologies Symposium) and NordSec, and coordinator of the Swedish IT Security Network for PhD Students (SWITS).

She received the IFIP Silver Core Award in 2011 and the IFIP William Winsborough Award in 2016.

See also
Swedish Civil Contingencies Agency

References

Swedish computer scientists
Swedish women computer scientists
Computer security academics
Academic staff of Karlstad University
Karlstad University alumni
Living people
1963 births
People from Lübeck